{{DISPLAYTITLE:21-hydroxysteroid dehydrogenase (NAD+)}}

In enzymology, a 21-hydroxysteroid dehydrogenase (NAD+) is an enzyme that catalyzes the chemical reaction

pregnan-21-ol + NAD+  pregnan-21-al + NADH + H+

Thus, the two substrates of this enzyme are pregnan-21-ol and NAD+, whereas its 3 products are pregnan-21-al, NADH, and H+.

This enzyme belongs to the family of oxidoreductases, specifically those acting on the CH-OH group of donor with NAD+ or NADP+ as acceptor. The systematic name of this enzyme class is 21-hydroxysteroid:NAD+ 21-oxidoreductase. This enzyme is also called 21-hydroxysteroid dehydrogenase (NAD+).

References

 

EC 1.1.1
NADH-dependent enzymes
Enzymes of unknown structure